Lyudmila Markovna Gurchenko (née Gurchenko; ; 12 November 1935 – 30 March 2011) was a popular Soviet and Russian actress, singer and entertainer. She was given the honorary title People's Artist of the USSR in 1983.

Biography
Lyudmila Gurchenko was born in Kharkiv, USSR (now Ukraine) in 1935 as Lyudmila Gurchenkova to Mark Gavrilovich Gurchenkov (1898–1973) and Yelena Aleksandrovna Simonova-Gurchenkova (1917–1999). Her father came from a Russian peasant family, while her mother was from Russian nobility — both from around Smolensk.

Before World War II they lived in a single room apartment on the ground floor at Mordvinovsky Lane No. 17 (now Gurchenko Lane #7). At that time, her parents worked at the Kharkiv Philharmonic Society. Mark Gurchenko was known to play the bayan (Russian accordion). Gurchenko spent a part of her childhood with her mom during the time of the German occupation of USSR in her native city, while her father joined the army and, together with his concert brigade, survived the war. After the withdrawal of the German Army from Kharkiv, Gurchenko auditioned for the local Beethoven Music School, where she performed the song About Vitya Cherevichkin with gestures, after which she was accepted as an acting student.

She moved to Moscow, enrolling in the Gerasimov Institute of Cinematography. At age 21, after starring in Eldar Ryazanov's 1956 directorial debut, the musical Carnival Night, Gurchenko overnight achieved fame as well as celebrity status. Throughout the next two years she toured the entire country with her Carnival Night-inspired musical numbers, attracting crowds of fans.

The Soviet cultural establishment, however, deemed her style too western and too out of line with Soviet standards. She was accused of receiving wages above State-set levels as compensation for her shows. She became the target of highly critical articles in several influential Soviet periodicals, including Tap Dance to the Left (Чечетка налево, Komsomolskaya Pravda, 1957) and Dositheos Morals (Досифеевские нравы, Ogoniok, 1958, devoted to her financial wrongdoing and her alleged lack of patriotism. The year of 1958 saw the release of another musical with Ludmila, Girl with a Guitar, shot mostly before these articles were published. The musical was not recommended for wide distribution and was a box-office flop.

In the mid 1970s, Gurchenko starred in several films, which, although only moderately successful, helped showcase her dramatic talent. In 1979 she landed a role in director Andrei Konchalovsky's Siberiade and in 1982 in Station for Two, once again by Eldar Ryazanov, who by then had become one of the USSR's most popular and prolific directors. The role of forty-something waitress Vera in this touching film became her long-awaited comeback as a superstar of Soviet film. Subsequently, she starred in Vladimir Menshov's Love and Pigeons, among many other movies and TV shows. Her multifaceted talent was recognized on many occasions. She received the title of People's Artist of the USSR, the highest honour that could be bestowed to a musical artist, in 1983. She carried a leading role in The Burn (Ожог – 1988) with Director Gennady Glagoliev and Director of Photography Igor Chepusov.

Gurchenko wrote a book about her life during German occupation in Kharkiv and about her life in the beginning of her Acting Career.

In 2010, she was awarded an Order "For Merit to the Fatherland", 2nd Class (she received the 4th Class of the same Order in 2000 and the 3d Class in 2005), one of the highest civil decorations in post-Soviet Russia (with 3rd and 2nd Degree Orders having been awarded to very few extremely distinguished individuals, and the 1st Degree Order being nominally held by a serving President of Russia). At the age of 70, she still performed and attended galas.

Personal life
Gurchenko was married six times, including a short-lived marriage to Joseph Kobzon between 1967 and 1970. She had one daughter, Maria (5 June 1959 — 8 November 2017) from her second marriage, and two grandchildren as well as one great-granddaughter.

On 14 February 2011, Gurchenko fell near her house and broke her hip. She was taken to the hospital and underwent an operation the following day. On 30 March her condition worsened due to a pulmonary embolism and she died that evening. She was buried at the Novodevichy Cemetery (Moscow) after a civil funeral a few days later.

Selected filmography

 The Road of Truth (1956)
 Chelovek rodilsya (1956) as Nadya Smirnova (voice)
 Carnival Night (1956) as Lena Krylova
 A Girl with a Guitar (1958) as Tanya Fedosova
 Baltic Skies (1961) as Sonya Bystrova
 Roman and Francesca (1961) as Francesca
 The Man from Nowhere (1961) as Lena
 Sluttish (1961) as Khristina
 Jalgrattataltsutajad (1964) as Rita Laur
 Balzaminov's Marriage (1964) as Ustinka
 Workers' Settlement (1966) as Mariya, Leonid's wife
 The Bridge Is Built (1966) as Zhenya
 Blasted Hell (1967) as Greta
 No and Yes (1967) as Lyusya Korablyova
 White Explosion (1969) as Vera Arsenova
 My good Dad (1970) as Valentina Ivanova
 Experiment (1970)
 One of us (1971) as Klara Ovcharenko
 Road to Rübezahl (1971) as Shura Solovyova
 Shadow (1971) as Yulia Juli
 The Crown of the Russian Empire, or Once Again the Elusive Avengers (1971) as Agrafena Zavolzhskaya
 What Is to Be Done?  (1971) as woman in black
 Karpukhin (1973) as Ovsyannikova
 Summer dreams (1973) as Galina Sakhno
 Dacha (1973) as Lera
 Open Book (1973) as Glafira Rybakova
 Old Walls (1973) as Anna Smirnova
 Vanyushin's Children (1974) as Klavdiya Shchyotkina
 The Straw Hat (1974) as Clara Bocardon
 Diary of a School Director (1975) as Nina Sergeyevna
 Step Forward (1976) as Valentina Stepanovna
 Prestuplenie (1976) as Lyuba
 Ma-ma (Мама, 1976) as Goat-Mom
 Sentimental Romance (1976) as Mariya Petruchenko
 Heavenly Swallows (Небесные ласточки, 1976) as Korina
 Family Melodrama (1976) as Valentina Barabanova
 Twenty Days Without War (1977) as Nina
 The Second Attempt of Viktor Krokhin (1977) as Lyuba
 Wrong Connection (1978) as Margarita Illarionovna Vyaznikova
 Go Away (1978)
 Getting to Know the Big, Wide World (1978) as stranger
 Five Evenings (1979) as Tamara Vasilyevna
 Siberiade (1979) as Taya Solomina in 1960s
 Particularly Important Task (1980) as Elvira Lunina
 An Ideal Husband (1981) as Mrs. Laura Cheveley
 Waiting for Love (Любимая женщина механика Гаврилова, 1981) as Rita
 Flights in Dreams and Reality (1983) as Larisa Yuryevna
 Station for Two (1983) as Vera Nikolayevna Nefedova
 Highway (1983) as Gvozdeva
 Shurochka (1983) as Raisa Peterson
 Recipe of Her Youth (1983)
 A Rogue's Saga (1984) as Ekaterina Ivanovna
 Love and Pigeons (1985) as Raisa Zakharovna
 Applause, Applause... (1985)
 Dreamers (1987) as Grafinyata
 Scorch (1988)
 A byl li Karotin (1990)
 Nelud, ili V rayu zapreshchena okhota (1990) as Zoya Sherstobitova - predsedatel gorispolkoma
 Our Dacha (1990)
 My Seawoman (1990) as Lyudmila Pashkova
 Imitator (1990) as singer
 Viva Gardes-Marines! (1991) as Joanna Elisabeth of Holstein-Gottorp
 Sekskazka (1991)
 Prosti nas, machekha-Rossiya (1991) as Natalya Fyodorovna Zimina
 Gardemarines-III (1992) as Joanna Elisabeth of Holstein-Gottorp
 Prokhindiada 2 (1994) as Yekaterina Ivanovna
 Old Hags (Старые клячи, 2000) as Liza
 Stealing Tarantino as Anna Vasilyevna
 Carnival Night 2 or 50 years later (2007)
 Pestrye sumerki (2010) as Anna Dmitrievna (final film role)

References

External links
 
  Official site of Lyudmila Gurchenko
 Lyudmila Gurchenko on YouTube
 Article at Historic Pravda (Ukrainian Pravda) dedicated to Gurchenko
 Bolgsite of Andrei Okara (Moscow political analyst) at Ukrainian Pravda with collection of Gurchenko's performances (video)

1935 births
2011 deaths
20th-century Russian women singers
20th-century Russian singers
Actors from Kharkiv
Musicians from Kharkiv
Honored Artists of the RSFSR
People's Artists of the RSFSR
People's Artists of the USSR
Recipients of the Nika Award
Recipients of the Order "For Merit to the Fatherland", 2nd class
Recipients of the Order "For Merit to the Fatherland", 3rd class
Recipients of the Order "For Merit to the Fatherland", 4th class
Recipients of the Order of the Red Banner of Labour
Recipients of the Vasilyev Brothers State Prize of the RSFSR
State Prize of the Russian Federation laureates
Russian film actresses
Russian pop singers
Soviet women singers
Soviet film actresses
Ukrainian people of Russian descent
Deaths from pulmonary embolism
Burials at Novodevichy Cemetery
Winners of the Golden Gramophone Award